Soil fixation may refer to:

measures of erosion control
soil stabilization in landscaping